Comeback is an album by Eric Burdon released in 1982, during the Comeback film project. It was the studio album to the film. Live tracks recorded during the sessions were released later on compilations.

It was re-released several times under the name Crawling King Snake and The Road. The Comeback Soundtrack (with studio and live tracks) was released in 1994.

Track listing
 "No More Elmore" (Eric Burdon, John Sterling) – 4:36
 "The Road" (Eric Burdon, John Sterling) – 4:50
 "Crawling King Snake" (Traditional; arranged by Eric Burdon) – 2:15
 "Take It Easy" (Delbert McClinton) – 3:41
 "Dey Won't" (James Newport, John Sterling) – 3:09
 "Wall of Silence" (Eric Burdon, John Sterling) – 3:10
 "Streetwalker" (Eric Burdon, John Sterling) – 3:12
 "It Hurts Me Too" (Elmore James) – 4:49
 "Lights Out" (Mac Rebennack, Seth David) – 1:45
 "Bird on the Beach" (Bernd Gärtig, Bertram Passmann, Eric Burdon, Frank Diez, Jackie Carter, Jean-Jacques Kravetz, Nippy Noya) – 4:02

Personnel
Louisiana Red - guitars and vocals
Joyce Angarola – vocals
Ronnie Barron – keyboards
Tony Braunagel – drums
Honey Brown – vocals
Eric Burdon – vocals
Luis Cabaza – keyboards
Lynn Carey – vocals
Steve Goldstein – keyboards
Kate Markowitz – vocals
Bobby Martin – saxophone
Bill McCubbin – bass guitar
Debi Neal – vocals
Carlton P. Sandercock – project co-ordinator
Lisa Scott – vocals
John Sterling – guitar
Christian Thompson – design
Tom Virgil – saxophone
W.G. Snuffy Walden – guitar
Terry Wilson – bass guitar

External links

1982 albums
Eric Burdon albums